"Rub It In" is a song written and originally recorded by Layng Martine Jr., and credited as Layng Martine. His version, released on the Barnaby Records label, was produced by Ray Stevens and was a U.S. chart single in the fall of 1971, reaching number 65.

Billy "Crash" Craddock recorded the song three years later on the album Rub It In, taking it to Number One on the country music charts and Top 20 on the pop charts in 1974. He told Tom Roland in The Billboard Book of Number One Country Hits that many stations refused to play it at first because they thought it was risque. "I said, 'We're talking about suntan lotion, and if you still think it's risque, then don't play it,'" Craddock said. "Evidently, they all went back and listened to it, and it was the biggest record we ever had." Craddock also made live recordings of the song on 1977's Live! and 2009's Live -N- Kickin'.

Craddock eventually recorded a sequel to the song, “You Rubbed It In All Wrong,” which borrows heavily from the original song's melody but instead replaces the lotion with sand, as the man's lover is discovered to be cheating on him. The sequel was also a top-5 hit on both the country charts.

A third version, in 1999 by country singer Matt King also charted on the country charts, from his album Hard Country. The song's melody was adapted by Glade to advertise their plug-in air fresheners ("plug it in, plug it in").

Chart performance

Layng Martine

Billy "Crash" Craddock

Matt King

Other cover versions
Dave Clark & Friends (1972)
Mel Street (1974) 
Mike Walker (2001), on the album Mike Walker
Jeff Bates (2006), on the album Leave the Light On.
Jack Jersey (1975), on the album "I Wonder"

References

1974 songs
Billy "Crash" Craddock songs
Matt King (singer) songs
Layng Martine Jr. songs
Jeff Bates songs
Songs written by Layng Martine Jr.
Atlantic Records singles
Song recordings produced by Ron Chancey
1971 songs
ABC Records singles